The Communauté de communes de l'Orée de la Brie is a communauté de communes in the Seine-et-Marne and Essonne departments and in the Île-de-France region of France. Its seat is Brie-Comte-Robert. Its area is 49.6 km2, and its population was 27,752 in 2018.

Composition
The communauté de communes consists of the following 4 communes (of which 1, Varennes-Jarcy, in Essonne):
Brie-Comte-Robert
Chevry-Cossigny
Servon
Varennes-Jarcy

References

Intercommunalities of Seine-et-Marne
Intercommunalities of Essonne
Commune communities in France